Cochran is a ghost town in Pinal County in the U.S. state of Arizona. The town was settled in 1905, in what was then the Arizona Territory.

History
Named after its first postmaster, John S. Cochran, the small mining camp also served as a stop on the Santa Fe, Prescott and Phoenix Railway.  The post office was established on January 3, 1905, and was discontinued on January 15, 1915. At its peak, the population was approximately 100, and housed a general store and a boardinghouse, among other establishments.

Apart from a few building foundations in the town center, and the railroad tracks at the edge of the now-abandoned town site, Cochran's last (and most notable) remains are five largely intact beehive coke ovens across the Gila River at Butte, Arizona.
 The Coke Ovens are on a 189-acre section of private property; visitation is not allowed.

Geography

References

External links
 Cochran Beehive Ovens description and directions
 Cochran entry at GhostTowns.com
 Cochran – Ghost Town of the Month at azghosttowns.com
 Coke oven photos, Google Earth map

Ghost towns in Arizona
Former populated places in Pinal County, Arizona
Mining communities in Arizona